Cents is a quarter in eastern Luxembourg City, in southern Luxembourg.

, the quarter has a population of 6,325 inhabitants.

The area lies on the eastern side of the city, on an elevated area 60 metres above Clausen and Neudorf.

History 
The Kéibierg connects the Grund and Clausen with the elevation of the Fetschenhof. The name "Kéibierg" ist first recorded in a document from 20 December 1506 as Gyersberg, and is later also mentioned as Gyrsberg, Geierspergh, and Gyhersperg. In 1666/67 in the accounts of the Hospital of St. John this had become the Gansberg, and in the cadaster of 1824 it is registered as the Küheberg.

The plateau of Cents-Fetschenhof was a useful area for any army wishing to attack the Fortress of Luxembourg from the East. Directly in front of the fortress walls, the elevation allowed a wide view over the whole city. In 1683 Marshal François de Créquy started the siege of Luxembourg, on the orders of French King Louis XIV. He set up his permanent camp to the East of the city at Mensdorf, where the name Krékelsbierg is still a reminder of him to this day. From there his troops — 12,000 infantry and cavalry — marched to the rise of Fetschenhof and fired on the city from the Kéibierg.

They fired 6,000 projectiles at the city, causing great destruction. The historian Leo Müller described how citizens of Metz observed "the eerie spectacle of the burning Luxembourg, which was blazing like an almighty torch". Shortly after Christmas, on 27 December 1683, the French marched off. The number of civilian casualties was quite low, but the suffering of the population was severe due to the winter cold. This was made worse by the order of the Governor Chimay, to uncover the houses, in order to decrease the risk of fire. Through the destruction of buildings and the weakened state of the population, it was easy for Marshall de Créqui to take over the city in April 1684 with 35,000. In this siege, the city was devastated by over 50,000 projectiles, and was later fortified by Vauban.

The French did not get to make much use of these extensive fortification works, however: in 1697 they returned Luxembourg to the Spanish. From 1713, when Luxembourg passed over to the Austrians under the Peace of Utrecht, it experienced a more peaceful time for both the fortress and its surrounding area. On 21 November 1794 however, the French again laid siege to the city, this time under the orders of the Directoire. Once again, the attackers made use of the strategic location of the Fetschenhof plateau. In a week, they had constructed the Fetschenhof entrenchment for 2 cannons — a structure which was expanded in April 1795 by six more cannons. While the city itself suffered less damage than under previous sieges, this time it was more the surrounding areas that suffered destruction. The Fetschenhof, for example, went up in flames.

See also

 Cents-Hamm railway station
 Luxembourg-Cents football stadium

References

Quarters of Luxembourg City